People v. Drew,  (1978), was a case decided by the California Supreme Court that abandoned the M'Naghten Rules of the criminal insanity defense in favor of the formulation in the Model Penal Code.  The decision was later abrogated by Proposition 8 in 1982, which restored the M'Naghten rules.

References

U.S. state criminal case law
1978 in United States case law
California state case law
1978 in California